Tragula falcifera is a species of sea snail, a marine gastropod mollusk in the family Pyramidellidae, the pyrams and their allies.

Description
The shell grows to a length of approximately 6.6 millimeters, relatively larger in size than the vast majority of other shells within this genus.

Distribution
The type specimen of this marine species was found off the coast of Bermudas at a depth of 1966 meters, an exceedingly deep elevation for this genus of Pyramidellidae, considering most of these mollusks do not exceed such depths as 1.966 kilometers.

References

External links
 To Encyclopedia of Life
 To World Register of Marine Species

Pyramidellidae
Gastropods described in 1881